Peter Paterson (1880 – after 1902) was a Scottish professional footballer who played as an inside forward.

References

1880 births
Footballers from Glasgow
Scottish footballers
Association football inside forwards
Royal Albert F.C. players
Everton F.C. players
Grimsby Town F.C. players
English Football League players
Year of death missing